Monark, also known as Cykelfabriken Monark AB and Monark AB, is a Swedish bicycle, moped and motorcycle manufacturer, established in Varberg, Sweden, in 1908 by the industrialist Birger Svensson. As of 2016, Monark is valued at 11.5 billion kr.

Company history
In the 1950s, Monark had a successful record in off-road motorcycle competitions. In 1954 they entered 8 bikes in the International Six Days Trial, a form of off-road motorcycle Olympics. All 8 Monark riders finished with Gold Medals. In 1959, Monark's Sten Lundin won the 500cc motocross world championship. When Monark stopped racing, Lundin re-badged his Monark motorcycle as a Lito and recaptured the world championship in 1961. He dropped to third place in the world championship in 1962, finished second to Rolf Tibblin in the 1963 world championship and, third in the 1964 world championship.

In 1961, Monark merged with Nymanbolagen, Uppsala, Sweden into Monark-Crescentbolagen or MCB. Monark is today part of Cycleurope, belonging to Grimaldi Industri AB. Monark is also a brand of Brazilian bicycles, related to the original Swedish Monark AB.

The Cykelfabriken should not be confused with the Monark-Silver King, Inc., Chicago, IL, a manufacturer of classic bicycles from 1934 to 1957, (formerly the Monark Battery Company). Nor should it be confused with the Monarch Cycle Manufacturing Company, 1892-1899, Chicago, New York, San Francisco, Toronto, founded by John William Kiser.

Models (bicycles and scooters)

Electric bicycle
Monark produces the Elcykel, an electric bicycle, built of aluminum with the same engine system including Posten AB uses. It utilizes a 10 Ah Lithium battery for long running time and fast recharge and is equipped with a Navgenerator, approved locks and immobilizers elimination part.
 ECO 1430- Electric bicycle with an aluminum unisex frame and a Panasonic electric motor with pedal assistance for fast and comfortable cycling. Li-ion battery of 10 Ah for fast recharge and long range.

Transporter

The Transporter is a Unisex steel work bike which is equipped with a heavy-duty front carrier and a robust kickstand. The rims are made of stainless steel and reinforced spokes They are available as Shimano Single or 3-speeds. They only come in black.
 Work Bike - The 450-453 Work Bike is a bicycle for business use that meets high visibility requirements. It is equipped with reflectors, sharp safety color, quality components are the obvious arguments. Available in 1 and 3 speed and comes in fluorescent yellow and black.
 Bayer - The Bayer is a simple and durable work bike which only comes in a step through frame and mounts a heavy-duty carrier to the front and a rack to the rear.

Truck

The Truck is workbike, popular in Denmark, It is a steel framed work bike with a front carrier and generator lightning. It is available as a single or three speed and only comes in Black.

Military bike

The military bike is a new version of the Swedish military bicycle, it is available in a men´s or women´s model. The rims are made of stainless steel with reinforced spokes. The bicycles are equipped with lock and generator lighting. They are only available in red or green and come as single or 3-speeds.

Specialized bikes

Monark produces the following Specialized bikes:
 Tricycle with two 20 or 24 inch rear wheels.
 Tricycle with two front wheels
 Tandem bicycle with 3 or 7-gears
 Trailer

Scooters

Monark produces the following scooters:
 Scooter 670
 Scooter 660
 Transport scooter 634 with large front carrying platform
 Three - Wheel scooter 624

References

External links

 Official Page (Swedish)
 Official Page (English)
 BICICLETAS MONARK SA Official Page (Brazil) (Portuguese)
 Monark of Peru (Spanish)
 1963 Monark 500 at the Motorcycle Hall of Fame
 1961 Monark / Lito
 The three most important motocross bikes ever made
 Monark Exercise
 Monark Sports and Medical
 Monark Prime 
 Vintage Monark - Monark of Sweden Motorcycles

Moped manufacturers
Cycle manufacturers of Sweden
Cycle manufacturers of Brazil
Motorcycle manufacturers of Sweden
Companies based in Halland County
Vehicle manufacturing companies established in 1908
1908 establishments in Sweden
Grimaldi Industri
Brazilian brands
Swedish brands